Remune is the first therapeutic HIV vaccine based on the killed whole virus approach.  
Remune was initially invented by Jonas Salk in 1987 and is now being developed by Immune Response BioPharma, Inc. (IRBP) 

Remune is a therapeutic HIV/AIDS vaccine that has completed over 25 clinical studies to date and shows a robust mechanism of action restoring white blood cell counts in CD4 & CD8 T cells by reducing viral load and increasing immunity.

The FDA is currently reviewing IRBP’s BLA (biologics licensing application) for therapeutic treatment in people with HIV.  Once the FDA approves the BLA, Remune will be the first therapeutic HIV vaccine brought to market.

IRBP is set to submit its BLA with the FDA in early 2014. REMUNE granted FDA Pediatric Orphan Designation on Feb 14th 2014.

Vaccine Design

Remune is made of beta-propiolactone inactive HIV-1 which has been irradiated to destroy the viral genome.  The vaccine, however, does not contain gp120 surface antigen as it falls off on fixation of HIV-1.  
 
As a result, only gp41 is remaining on the virion surface.  Fortunately the initial clinical trial proved that a significant difference in clinical benefit between Remune vaccine and placebo with a decline in viral load  P < 0.05 & HIV-1 lymphocyte proliferation P < 0.001 both favoring the Remune Group.
 
The International AIDS Vaccine Research (IAVA) issued a report on “Whole Killed AIDS Vaccines” in 1999 reviewing a diverse aspect of the killed virus approach.[

Update

Trials of Remune have largely shown no benefit. Immune Response Corporation (IRC), one of the developers of Remune, tried unsuccessfully to block negative research findings. Pfizer pulled out of its partnership with IRC and there is now doubt about any further development of Remune.

References

HIV vaccine research